Freedom from fear is listed as a fundamental human right according to The Universal Declaration of Human Rights. On January 6, 1941, United States President Franklin D. Roosevelt called it one of the "Four Freedoms" at his State of the Union, which was afterwards therefore referred to as the "Four Freedoms speech".

Origins
In his speech, President Franklin D. Roosevelt formulated freedom from fear as follows: "The fourth is freedom from fear, which, translated into world terms, means a world-wide reduction of armaments to such a point and in such a thorough fashion that no nation will be in a position to commit an act of physical aggression against any neighbor—anywhere in the world."

The four freedoms of Roosevelt formed an important pillar of the Universal Declaration of Human Rights that were adopted on December 10, 1948, by the United Nations General Assembly. The freedom from fear is mentioned in the preamble of the Declaration.

Inspiration
In 1943, painter Norman Rockwell created Freedom from Fear, in his series of four paintings called Four Freedoms.

It is an important concept for Burmese Aung San Suu Kyi, who published a book on it in 1991 with the title Freedom from Fear. In 1999 historian David M. Kennedy published a book called Freedom from Fear: The American People in Depression and War, 1929–1945.

See also 
 Freedom of speech
 Four Freedoms Award
 Four Freedoms Monument
 Human security
 Right to an adequate standard of living
 Freedom from fear book by Aung San Suu Kyi

References 

Human rights
Presidency of Franklin D. Roosevelt
Speeches by Franklin D. Roosevelt
Four Freedoms